Tewodros II (baptized as Gebre Kidan;  1818 – 13 April 1868) was Emperor of Ethiopia from 1855 until his death in 1868. His rule is often placed as the beginning of modern Ethiopia and brought an end to the decentralized Zemene Mesafint (Era of the Princes).

Tewodros II's origins were in the Era of the Princes, but his ambitions were not those of the regional nobility. He sought to re-establish a cohesive Ethiopian state and to reform its administration and church. He sought to restore Solomonic hegemony, and he considered himself the Elect of God.

Tewodros II's first task after having reunited the other provinces was to bring Shewa under his control. During the Era of the Princes, Shewa was, even more than most provinces, an independent entity, its ruler even styling himself Negus (Neguece), the title for King. In the course of subduing the Shewans, Tewodros took with him a Shewan prince, Menelik II who he brought up as his own son, who would later become Emperor (or Atse) himself. Despite his success against Shewa, Tewodros faced constant rebellions by stiffnecked nobles in other regions not understanding the benefits of modernization. He ultimately committed suicide at the Battle of Magdala, during the British Expedition to Abyssinia.

In the first six years of his reign, the new ruler managed to put down these rebellions, and the empire was relatively peaceful from about 1861 to 1863, but the energy, wealth, and manpower necessary to deal with regional opposition limited the scope of Tewodros's other activities. 
Tewodros II never realized his dream of restoring a strong monarchy, although he took many important initial steps. He sought to establish the principle that governors and judges must be salaried appointees. He also established a professional standing army, rather than depending on local lords to provide soldiers for his expeditions. He introduced the collection of books in the form of a library, tax codes, as well as a centralized political system with respective administrative districts. He also intended to reform the church but he was confronted by strong opposition when he tried to impose a tax on church lands to help finance government activities. His confiscation of these lands gained him enemies in the church and little support elsewhere. Essentially, Tewodros was a talented military campaigner.

Description 

The British Consul Walter Plowden knew well the political events of Ethiopia during the 1850s and had foretold the rising star of Kassa the freelance warrior from Qwara.

When being crowned as King, Plowden described him as such:

The French explorer, geographer, ethnologist, linguist and astronomer Antoine Thomson D'Abbadie describes the monarch during his stay in Ethiopia:

Georg Wilhelm Schimper the German botanist had mentioned the following about Tewodros:

Early life 
Kassa Hailu was born in Qwara west of Gondar, his father was an Amhara nobleman of the Qwara district named Hailegiorgis Woldegiorgis. His paternal grandfather, Dejazmatch Woldegiorgis, was a widely respected figure of his time. Dembiya was part of the large territory known as Ye Maru Qemas, which translates as "the taste of the honey" or literally "What has been tasted by Maru". This name was given to the territory because it was the personal fief of Dejazmach Maru, a powerful warlord, and relative of Kassa (possibly an uncle). When Maru died in October 1827, his fiefdom was given (albeit begrudgingly) to Dejazmach Hailu  by the governor of the province, Empress Menen Liben Amede. Kassa was in line to potentially take control of Ye Maru Qemas after Kenfu's death (though Kenfu also wanted to give the land to his own sons). When Kenfu died, however, neither his sons nor Kassa inherited control of the territory because Empress Menen Liben re-annexed it under her own control.

Kassa's mother, Woizero Atitegeb Wondbewossen, was of the upper nobility, and was originally from Amhara Sayint in Wollo. Her mother Woizero Tishal was a member of a noble family of Begemder, while her paternal grandfather, Ras Wodajo, was a powerful and highly influential figure. It is thought that Tewodros II's paternal side of the family carried with it a slim margin of Solomonic pedigree, however insignificant it proved when compared to the more prominently illustrious ancestries of some of his highborn rivals. Tewodros, in his reign, indeed claimed that his father was descended from Emperor Fasilides by way of a daughter.

When Kassa was very young, his parents divorced and Woizero Atitegeb moved back to Gondar taking her son with her. Not long after their departure, however, news reached them that Kassa's father had died. Popular legend states that Kassa's paternal relatives split up the entire paternal inheritance, leaving young Kassa and his mother with nothing and in very dire circumstances financially. In hard times, his enemies came up with a rumour that his wife was reduced to selling Kosso. There is actually no evidence that Woizero Atitegeb was ever a Kosso seller, and several writers such as Paulos Ngo Ngo have stated outright that it was a false rumor spread by her detractors. Evidence indicates that Woizero Atitegeb was fairly well to do, and indeed had inherited considerable land holdings from her own illustrious relatives to lead a comfortable life. Kassa's youth was probably not lived lavishly, but he was far from a pauper.

Kassa was sent to school at the convent of Tekla Haymanot, between Gondar and Lake Tana. He took refuge until it was sacked by a defeated, Dejazmatch Wube, who by burning and dismembering the children, took vengeance on their victorious parents. Kassa escaped and fled to the protection of his kinsman, Dejazmach Kenfu, probably his uncle but believed to be his half-brother. He continued his formal education and became familiar with the Bible and Ethiopian literature. He also received instruction on the techniques of Ethiopian warfare from Kenfu. When Kenfu died, and his two sons were defeated by another Dajazmach (earl), Dajazmach Goshu of Damot and Gojjam, Kassa was forced to make another start in life, and offered his services to Goshu.

Rise to power

Kassa Hailu was born into a country rife with civil war, and he defeated many regional noblemen and princes before becoming emperor during time known as the Zemene Mesafint or "Age of the Princes". During this era, regional princes, and noble lords of diverse ethnic and religious backgrounds vied with each other for power and control of the Gondarine Emperor.  A puppet Emperor of the Solomonic dynasty was enthroned in Gondar by one nobleman, only to be dethroned and replaced by another member of the Imperial dynasty when a different regional prince was able to seize Gondar and the reins of power. Regions such as Gojjam and Shewa were ruled by their own branches of the Imperial dynasty and, in Shewa, the local prince went as far as assuming the title of King.  Nevertheless, a semblance of order and unity was maintained in northern Ethiopia during the era of the Princes by the powerful Rases of the Were Sheik dynasty of Wollo such as Ras Ali the Great and Ras Gugsa who controlled Gondar and the Emperor.

Kassa began his career in this era as a shifta or outlaw, but after amassing a sizable force of followers, was able to not only restore himself to his father's previous fief of Qwara but was able to control all of Dembiya. Moreover, he gained popular support by his benevolent treatment of the inhabitants in the areas he controlled: according to Sven Rubenson, Kassa "shared out captured grain and money to the peasants in Qwara and told them to buy hoes and plant." This garnered notice of the nobleman in control of Gondar, Ras Ali II of Yejju of Wollo. Empress Menen Liben Amede, wife of Emperor Yohannes III, and the mother of Ras Ali, arranged for Kassa to marry her granddaughter, Tewabech Ali. She awarded him all of Ye Meru Qemas in the hopes of binding him firmly to her son and herself.

Although all sources and authorities believe that Kassa truly loved and respected his wife, his relationship with his new in-laws deteriorated largely because of the disdainful treatment he repeatedly received from the Empress Menen. By 1852, he rebelled against Ras Ali and, in a series of victories — Gur Amaba, Takusa, Ayshal, and Amba Jebelli — over the next three years he handily defeated every army the Ras and the Empress sent against him. At Ayshal he captured the Empress Menen, and Ras Ali fled. Kassa announced that he was deposing Emperor Yohannes III, and then marched on his greatest remaining rival, Dejazmach Wube Haile Maryam of Semien. Kassa refused to acknowledge an attempt to restore the former Emperor Sahle Dengel in the place of the hapless Yohannes III who had acknowledged Kassa immediately. Yohannes III was treated well by Kassa who seems to have had some personal sympathy for him. His views on Sahle Dengel are not known but are not likely to have been sympathetic. Following the defeat of Dejazmach Wube, Kassa was crowned Emperor by Abuna Salama III in the church of Derasge Maryam on February 11, 1855. He took the throne name of Tewodros II, attempting to fulfill a prophecy that a man named Tewodros would restore the Ethiopian Empire to greatness and rule for 40 years.

Military skills

His military experience started when he served in his half brother's army, he had fought in the Battle of Wadkaltabu were he helped defeat an Egyptian raid. His uncle, Dejazmach Kenfu died in 1839 and Qwara was lost to the family and claimed by Empress Menen of Gondar. Kassa Hailu resorted to become a shifta, one who refuses to recognize his feudal lord. Kassa Hailu organized his own army in the plains of Qwara. When he became too powerful to ignore, as a way to deal with him without using force, he was named Dajazmach of Qwara and given the hand of Tawabach, the daughter of Ras Ali of Begemder, in 1845.

Kassa was very close to Tawabach and devoted to his marriage but his submission to Empress Menen was short-lived. In October 1846, he attacked and plundered Dembea, a city located due south of Gondar, and in January 1847 he went on to occupy Gondar. When Kassa unoccupied Gondar later that year, Empress Menen sent an army after him into north of Lake Tana. Kassa easily defeated the army and took the Empress as prisoner (Marcus 2002, 60). Her son, Ras Ali of Begemder, chose to negotiate with Kassa; he gave Kassa all lands west and north of Lake Tana and Kassa in return released his mother (Prouty and Rosenfeld 1982, 60). The reconciled relationship with Empress Menen led him to join up with Ras Ali and Ras Goshu Zewde of Gojam. However, when conflict re-emerged yet again in 1852, Kassa retreated back to Qwara to re-strengthen his troops.

In 1842 Tewodros invaded Egyptian-controlled Sudan from western Ethiopia, successfully capturing Metemma. However, he suffered a major defeat in March 1848 at the Battle of Dabarki, effectively ending his invasion. The defeat at Dabarki led to Tewodros taking efforts to modernize his military, incorporating firearm drills and more modern artillery.

Reign

Tewodros sought to unify and modernise Ethiopia. However, since he was nearly always away on campaign during his tenure as emperor, disloyal leaders frequently tried to dislodge him while he was away fighting. Within a few years, he had forcibly brought back under direct Imperial rule the Kingdom of Shewa and the province of Gojjam. He crushed the many lords and princes of Wollo and Tigray and brought recalcitrant regions of Begemder and Simien under his direct rule.

He moved the capital city of the Empire from Gondar, first to Debre Tabor, and later to Magdala. Tewodros ended the division of Ethiopia among the various regional lords and princes that had vied among each other for power for almost two centuries. He forcibly re-incorporated the regions of Gojjam, Tigre, Shewa and Wollo under the direct administration of the Imperial throne after they had been ruled by local branches of the Imperial dynasty (in Gojjam and Shewa) or other noblemen (Wollo). With all of his rivals apparently subdued, he imprisoned them and their relatives at Magdala. Among the royal and aristocratic prisoners at Magdala was the young Prince of Shewa, Sahle Mariam, the future Emperor Menelik II. Tewodros doted on the young prince, and married him to his own daughter Alitash Tewodros. Menelik would eventually escape from Magdala, and abandon his wife, offending Tewodros deeply.

The death of his beloved wife, Empress Tewabech, marked the start of a deterioration in Tewodros II's behavior. Increasingly erratic and vengeful, he gave full rein to some of his more brutal tendencies now that the calming influence of his wife was absent. For instance, after the murder of the English traveller, John Bell, who had become the emperor's close friend and confidante, the emperor, in revenge, had 500 prisoners beheaded in Debarek.  Then, in February 1863, after defeating the rebel, Tedla Gwalu, Tewodros ordered the killing of the 7,000 prisoners he had taken.

Tewodros II remarried, this time to the daughter of his imprisoned enemy Dejazmatch Wube. The new Empress, Tiruwork Wube was a proud and haughty woman, very aware of her illustrious Solomonic ancestry.  She is said to have intended on the religious life and becoming a nun, especially after the fall of her father and his imprisonment along with her brothers at the hands of Tewodros II.  However, Tewodros' request for her hand in marriage was seen by her family as an opportunity to get Dejazmatch Wube and his sons freed from imprisonment, and so they prevailed on her to marry the Emperor.  However, while the conditions of their imprisonment were eased, Dejazmatch Wube and his sons were not released, deeply imbittering Empress Tiruwork against Tewodros.  Already feeling that she had married far beneath her dignity to a usurper, the failure of the Emperor to free her family did not help their marital relationship. The marriage was very far from a happy one, and was extremely stormy. They did have a son, Dejazmatch Alemayehu Tewodros, whom the Emperor adored and whom he regarded as his heir.

By October 1862, Emperor Tewodros' position as ruler had become precarious, much of Ethiopia was in revolt against him, except for a small area stretching from Lake Tana east to his fortress at Magdala, Ethiopia. He was engaged in constant military campaigns against a wide array of rebels. Likewise, Abyssinia was also threatened by the encroachment of Islam as Muslim Turks and Egyptians repeatedly invaded Ethiopia from the Red Sea and from Sudan while the Muslim Oromo tribe was expanding throughout Central Ethiopia. Tewodros wrote a letter to Queen Victoria as a fellow Christian monarch, asking for British assistance in the region.  Tewodros asked the British Consul in Ethiopia, Captain Charles Duncan Cameron, to carry a letter to Queen Victoria requesting skilled workers to come to teach his subjects how to produce firearms, and other technical skills. Cameron traveled to the coast with the letter, but when he informed the Foreign Office of the letter and its contents, the Foreign Office instructed him simply to send the letter to London rather than take it himself. He was to proceed to Sudan to make inquiries about the slave trade there. After doing this, Cameron returned to Ethiopia.

On Cameron's return, the Emperor became enraged when he found out that Cameron had not taken the letter to London personally, had not brought a response from the Queen, and most of all, had spent time traveling through enemy Egyptian and Turkish territories. Cameron tried to appease the Emperor saying that a reply to the letter would arrive shortly. The Foreign Office in London did not pass the letter to Queen Victoria, but simply filed it under Pending. There the letter stayed for a year. Then the Foreign Office sent the letter to India, because Abyssinia came under the Raj's remit. It is alleged that when the letter arrived in India, officials filed it under Not Even Pending.

Britain had several reasons for ignoring the letter. The British Empire's interests in Northeast Africa were quite different from those of Tewodros. The British did not want to conduct a Christian "crusade" against Islam but instead to cooperate politically, strategically and commercially with the Ottoman Empire, Egypt and the Sudan. This was not only to protect the route to India but also to ensure that the Ottoman Empire continued to act as a buffer against Russia's plans for expansion into Central Asia. More-so, as a result of the American Civil War, deliveries of cotton from the American South to the British textile industry were cut off entirely, making the British increasingly dependent on Egyptian-Sudanese cotton. The British did not wish to see a conflagration in the region which would upset the status-quo.

After two years had passed and Tewodros had not received a reply, he imprisoned Cameron, together with all the British subjects in Ethiopia and various other Europeans, in an attempt to get the queen's attention. His prisoners included an Anglican missionary named Henry A. Stern, who had previously published a book in Europe describing Tewodros as a barbaric, cruel, unstable usurper. When Tewodros saw this book, he became violently angry, pulled a gun on Stern, and had to be restrained from killing the missionary. He then beat to death the two servants Stern had brought with him.  Tewodros also received reports from abroad that foreign papers had quoted these European residents of Ethiopia as having said many negative things about him and his reign.

Conflict with Great Britain

The British sent a mission under an Assyrian-born British subject, Hormuzd Rassam, who bore a letter from the Queen (in response to Tewodros' now three-year-old letter requesting aid). He did not bring the skilled workers as Tewodros had requested. Deeply insulted by the British failure to do exactly as they were told, Tewodros had the members of the Rassam mission added to his other European prisoners. This last breach of diplomatic immunity was the catalyst to Britain launching the 1868 Expedition to Abyssinia under Robert Napier. He traveled from India, then a British colony, with more than 30,000 personnel (a force of 13,000 troops and 26,000 camp followers), which consisted of not only soldiers but also specialists such as engineers. Tewodros had become increasingly unpopular over the years due to his harsh methods, and many regional figures had rebelled against him. Several readily assisted the British by providing guides and food as the expeditionary force marched towards Magdala, where the Emperor had fortified the mountaintop.

When the two sides met at Arogye, in the plain facing Magdala, on 10 April 1868, the British defeated the Abyssinian army. With Tewodros' army so decisively defeated, many of his men began to desert and the emperor was left with only 4,000 soldiers. Tewodros II attempted to make peace. Napier responded with a message thanking him for this peace offering and stating that he would treat the Emperor and his family with every dignity. Tewodros II furiously responded that he would never be taken prisoner. The British shelled Magdala, which killed most of Tewodros's remaining soldiers. Tewodros released all the Europeans unharmed but ordered 300 Ethiopian prisoners to be flung over the cliff.

The emperor committed suicide on Easter Monday, 13 April 1868, as the British troops stormed the citadel of Magdala. 

He has been said to have used a pistol which he had used during fighting for unification during the era, though in reality he used a duelling pistol gifted to him by Queen Victoria and presented by Consul Cameron. Tewodros II was buried by the British troops at Magdala's Medhane Alem (Savior of the World) Orthodox Church under the name of Theodore II.  In 2019 the National Army Museum announced the return to Ethiopia of a lock of Tewodros' hair, taken after his death in battle.
Magdala was in the territory of the Muslim (Oromo) tribes who had long ago taken it from the Amhara people; however Tewodros had won it back from them some years before. Two rival Galla queens, Werkait and Mostiat, who had both allied themselves with the British claimed control of the conquered fortress as a reward. However, both Queens could not come to an arrangement and Napier ultimately decided that it would be best to destroy the fortress and consign it to flames. After a thorough medical examination which confirmed Tewodros' death as the result of suicide, the body was dressed and laid out in a hut. By the request of the Emperor's widow, the body was later buried in the Church of Magdala.

After Tewodros has been buried, Napier allowed his troops to loot the citadel as a punitive measure; according to historian Richard Pankhurst, "fifteen elephants and almost 200 mules were required to carry away the booty". These became dispersed in museums and state collections across Europe, though some looted artifacts have been returned to Ethiopia. Tewodros II's family later moved the Emperor's remains to the Mahedere Selassie Monastery in his native Qwara, where they remain to this day.

Following some short squabbles for the throne after his death, Tewodros II was eventually succeeded by Yohannes IV as the next Emperor of Ethiopia.

Heirs

The widowed Empress Tiruwork and the young heir of Tewodros, Alemayehu, were also to be taken to England. However, Empress Tiruwork died on the journey to the coast, and little Alemayehu made the journey alone. The Empress was buried at Sheleqot monastery in Tigray where her ancestors ruled. Although Queen Victoria subsidised the education at Rugby of Dejazmatch Alemayehu Tewodros, Captain Tristam Speedy was appointed as his guardian. He developed a very strong attachment to Captain Speedy and his wife. However, Prince Alemayehu grew increasingly lonely as the years went by, and his compromised health made things even harder. He died in October 1879 at the age of 19 without seeing his homeland again. Prince Alemayehu left an impression on Queen Victoria, who wrote of his death in her journal: "It is too sad! All alone in a strange country, without a single person or relative belonging to him... His was no happy life".
Emperor Tewodros II had an elder son born outside of wedlock, named Meshesha Tewodros. Meshesha was frequently at odds with his father, especially after it was learned that he had assisted Menelik of Shewa in his escape from Magdala. When Menelik became Emperor of Ethiopia, Meshesha Tewodros was raised to the title of Ras and given Dembia as his fief. Ras Meshesha would remain a loyal friend of Emperor Menelik II until his death, and his descendants were regarded as among the highest nobility and the leading representatives of Tewodros' line.

Tewodros II's much loved daughter, Woizero Alitash Tewodros, was the first wife of Menelik of Shewa who eventually became Emperor Menelik II of Ethiopia. Woizero Alitash was abandoned by her husband when Menelik escaped from Magdala to return and reclaim his Shewan throne. She was subsequently remarried to Dejazmatch Bariaw Paulos of Adwa. When Menelik II was proclaimed Emperor of Ethiopia at Were Illu in Wollo shortly after the death of Yohannes IV, Woizero Alitash was among the first of the nobility to travel to Were Illu to pay homage to her former husband as the new Emperor. Rumors persist that Alitash and Emperor Menelik may have rekindled their relationship and that Alitash found that she was pregnant by the Emperor in the following months. The rumors continue that upon hearing about this pregnancy of the Emperor's first wife, the childless and barren Empress Taytu Bitul had Alitash poisoned. Yet a different version of these rumors state that she gave birth to a boy and handed him over to a friend to be raised as a common farmer in Shewa. The eldest descendant of this line now resides in Kenya married to the daughter of a Jegna, some Ethiopians believe them to be the only legitimate heirs to the line of Tewedros II and Menelik II. Regardless of the veracity of these rumors, Woizero Alitash Tewodros, daughter of Tewodros II, died within the first few months of the reign of her ex-husband Menelik II.

Honours
  Ascanian duchies: Grand Cross of Albert the Bear, 15 March 1863

In popular culture
 Emperor Tewodros has come to occupy a high regard amongst many Ethiopians. Examples of his influence are seen in plays, literature, folklore, songs and art works (such as a 1974 book by Sahle Sellassie). Emperor Tewodros has come to symbolise Ethiopian unity and identity.Tsegaye Gebre-Medhin wrote his play 'Tewodros' in 1963. Chronicles of his life have been seen to be significant in the formation of Amharic and Ethiopian literature in English.
 Tewodros, under the name Theodore, appears in George MacDonald Fraser's fictionalised account of the 1868 conflict, Flashman on the March, where he is portrayed as a volatile, bloodthirsty madman.
 Karen Mercury's historical fiction The Four Quarters of the World (Medallion Press, 2006) depicts the rise and fall of Tewodros as seen through the eyes of his European captives, using primary sources from eyewitnesses to create an unbiased portrait of the Emperor.
When the Emperor Dies by Mason McCann Smith is another work of historical fiction based around the rise, reign and fall of Emperor Tewodros.
 Philip Marsden's The Barefoot Emperor chronicles the life and times of Emperor Tewodros's quest for power and his reign. Marsden remarks that Tewodros's violence makes him ambiguous to be a true hero worthy of a bronze statue like Napier in London.
 Tewodros features prominently in Alan Moorehead's historical survey The Blue Nile.
 John Pridham composed and published a piano solo piece, "Abyssinian Expedition", commemorating the Battle of Magdala. The digitized (scanned) sheet music can be found at the National Library of Australia's website.
 Emperor Tewodros appears as the leader of the Ethiopians in Age of Empires III: Definitive Edition - The African Royals.

References

Bibliography
 Paul B. Henze. "The Empire from Atrophy to Revival: The Era of the Princes and Tewodros II" in Layers of Time: A History of Ethiopia. New York: Palgrave, 2000. 
Antoine d'Abbadie d'Arrast,  L'Abyssinie et le roi Théodore, Ch. Douniol, Paris, 1868 online
 (Amharic letter) Lettre du Negussa Negest Téwodros II à un destinataire inconnu, sur le site des archives nationales d'Addis Abeba በኢንተርኔት 
 Bahru Zewde, James Currey, A History of Modern Ethiopia, 1855–1991, London, 2002, pp. 64–111 ; partie II (« Unification and Independence - 1855 - 1896 »), chap. I (« The first response : Kasa - Tewodros »), page 27-42
 Sven Rubenson, King of Kings: Tewodros of Ethiopia, Addis Ababa, Haile Selassie I University,1966
 Sir Darrell Bates, The Abyssinian Difficulty: The Emperor Theodorus and the Magdala Campaign, 1867–68, Oxford Press, 1979
  Shiferaw Bekele, L'Éthiopie contemporaine (sous la direction de Gérard Prunier), Karthala, 2007, 440 pages, ; chap. III (« La restauration de l'État éthiopien dans la seconde moitié du XIXe siècle »), partie I (« L'ascension de Tewodros II et la restauration de la monarchie (1855-1868) »), p. 92-97

Further reading
 Anderson, Ruth. "A study of the career of Theodore II, Emperor of Ethiopia, 1855-1868 /." Doctoral dissertation, Ohio State University (1967)
 Henry Blanc, A Narrative of Captivity in Abyssinia; With Some Account of the Late Emperor Theodore, His Country and People (1868), available at Project Gutenberg
 Jesman, Czeslaw. "Theodore II of Ethiopia" History Today. (April 1972), pp. 255-264
 C. R. Markham, History of the Abyssinian Expedition (1869)
 Frederick Myatt, The March to Mandala (1970)

External links

 Tewodros II at the Imperial Ethiopia Homepages
 Ethiopian Treasures - Emperor Tewodros II, Battle of Meqdala - Ethiopia
 The Great Unifier: Emperor Tewodros II of Ethiopia

1810s births
1868 deaths
19th-century emperors of Ethiopia
19th-century monarchs in Africa
1860s suicides
People from Amhara Region
Emperors of Ethiopia
People of the Abyssinian War
Suicides by firearm in Ethiopia
Solomonic dynasty
Heads of state who committed suicide